The 2003 Franklin Templeton Classic was a men's tennis tournament played on outdoor hard courts in Scottsdale, Arizona in the United States which was part of the International Series of the 2003 ATP Tour. It was the 16th edition of the tournament and was held from March 3 through March 9, 2003. First-seeded Lleyton Hewitt won the singles title.

Finals

Singles

 Lleyton Hewitt defeated  Mark Philippoussis 6–4, 6–4
 It was Hewitt's 1st singles title of the year and the 18th of his career.

Doubles

 James Blake /  Mark Merklein defeated  Lleyton Hewitt /  Mark Philippoussis 6–4, 6–7(2–7), 7–6(7–5)
 It was Blake's only title of the year and the 3rd of his career. It was Merklein's only title of the year and the 3rd of his career.

References

External links
 ITF tournament edition details

Franklin Templeton Classic
Tennis Channel Open
 
Franklin Templeton Classic
Franklin Templeton Classic
Franklin Templeton Classic